Y2K: The Game is a point-and-click adventure game developed by Runecraft and published by Interplay Entertainment in 1999. Notable actors involved in the game include Michael Bell, Tony Jay, Grey DeLisle, Dan Castellaneta, Danny Mann and John Mariano.

Plot
Dharke Manor had been built in 1866 and refurbished in the 1920s by Aleister Dharke. After his death, his company used his house as an electronics laboratory eventually advancing on to robotics, cybernetics and AI. With their experiments on the brink of compromise, the Aleister company was able to get a lowly accountant to pass the property on to Buster Everman. Buster's girlfriend Candace realises what he is getting himself into and heads to the manor to save him from the mad Y2K computer.

Release
Interplay intended to launch the game by December 1999 to coincide with the upcoming Year 2000 problem that was prophesied.

Reception

References

External links

1999 video games
Video games developed in the United Kingdom
Windows games
Windows-only games
Point-and-click adventure games